Murataly Abdykarovich Tagaev (born on June 15, 1978) is a Kyrgyz politician who has been serving as Mayor of Jalal-Abad since 2018. He is fluent in both Kyrgyz and Russian, but he needs a dictionary to read in English.

Career
 2010–2012 Director General, shopping centre "Tagai Biy", Jalal-Abad
 2017–2018 Speaker of the city council of Jalal-Abad

Awards and honours
 2013: People’s Chairperson
 2015: Honorary Citizen of Suzak District

References

 
Mayors of places in Kyrgyzstan
1978 births
Living people